Reed or Reeds may refer to:

Science, technology, biology, and medicine 
 Reed bird (disambiguation)
 Reed pen, writing implement in use since ancient times
 Reed (plant), one of several tall, grass-like wetland plants of the order Poales
 Reed reaction, in chemistry
 Reed receiver, an outdated form of multi-channel signal decoding
 Reed relay, one or more reed switches controlled by an electromagnet
 Reed switch, an electrical switch operated by an applied magnetic field
 Reed valve, restricts the flow of fluids to a single direction
 Reed (weaving), a comb like tool for beating the weft when weaving
 Reed's law, describes the utility of large networks, particularly social networks
 Reed–Solomon error correction, a systematic way of building codes that can be used to detect and correct multiple random symbol errors
 Reed–Sternberg cell, related to Hodgkin's disease

Organizations 
 Reed (company), offering employment-related services (UK)
 Reed and Stem, former architecture firm St. Paul, Minnesota
 Reed Arena, a sports arena in College Station, Texas
 Reed College, Portland, Oregon
 Reed Research Reactor, a research nuclear reactor at the college
 Reed, Portland, Oregon, the surrounding neighborhood
 Reed-Custer High School, in Braidwood, Illinois
 Reed Elsevier, a publishing company
 Reed Construction Data
 Reed Business Information
 Reed Exhibitions, trade fairs and convention organizing company
 Reed family, family of Mark E. Reed
 Reeds Jewelers, a U.S. retail jewelry company 
 Reed High School (disambiguation)
 Reed House (disambiguation), several
 Reed Middle School (disambiguation), several
 Reed Plantation, Maine, United States
 Reed Publishing, a New Zealand publishing house
 Reed's, Inc., manufactures naturally brewed sodas, California, United States
 Records of Early English Drama (REED), a theatre research centre at the University of Toronto, Canada

People 
 Reed (name), a surname or given name

Places

Cities and towns 
 Reed, Arkansas, United States
 Reed, Kentucky, United States
 Reeds, Virginia, United States
 Reed, Wisconsin, United States
 Reed City, Michigan, United States
 Reed-Cooke, a neighborhood in Washington DC, United States
 Reed Creek, Georgia, United States
 Reed, Hertfordshire, United Kingdom
 Reed, Norway
 Reeds Branch, a stream in Missouri
 Reed Point, Montana, of statistical meaning only
 Reed Plantation, Maine, United States
 Reed Township, Dauphin County, Pennsylvania, United States

Historic interest 
 Reed-Wood Place, a historic site Littleton, Massachusetts
 Reed's Creek Farm, a historic home Maryland, United States
 Reed and Barton Complex, a historic industrial complex in Taunton, Massachusetts
 Reed Gold Mine, defunct, in Midland, North Carolina
 Reed Memorial Library, Carmel, New York, United States

Other uses 
 Reed Airport (disambiguation)
 Reed v. Reed, a United States Supreme Court case (Equal Protection case)
 Reed's Regiment of Militia, a military unit in the U.S. war of independence
 Reeding, the process or effect of creating "reeds" around the edges of coins, furniture, and architectural columns
 Reed (mouthpiece), the vibrating piece in woodwind musical instrument
Double reed
Quadruple reed
 Reed pipe, a type of organ pipe, as distinct from a flue pipe

See also 
 Reid (disambiguation)
 Reed-Muller (disambiguation)
 Justice Reed (disambiguation)